The 2010 Seguros Bolívar Open Medellín was a professional tennis tournament played on outdoor red clay courts. It was the seventh edition of the tournament which was part of the 2010 ATP Challenger Tour. It took place in Medellín, Colombia between 1 and 7 November 2010.

ATP entrants

Seeds

 Rankings are as of October 25, 2010.

Other entrants
The following players received wildcards into the singles main draw:
  Alejandro González
  Eric Nunez
  Eduardo Struvay
  Martín Vassallo Argüello

The following players received entry from the qualifying draw:
  Andrea Arnaboldi
  Axel Michon
  Gianluca Naso
  Eládio Ribeiro Neto

Champions

Singles

 Marcos Daniel def.  Juan Sebastián Cabal, 6–3, 7–5

Doubles

 Juan Sebastián Cabal /  Robert Farah def.  Franco Ferreiro /  André Sá, 6–3, 7–5

External links
Official website of Seguros Bolívar Tennis
ITF search 
2010 Combo Sheet

Seguros Bolivar Open Medellin
2010 in Colombian tennis
Tennis tournaments in Colombia
Seguros Bolívar Open Medellín